Streptomyces beijiangensis is a psychrotolerant bacterium species from the genus of Streptomyces which has been isolated from soil from Beijiang from the Xinjiang Uyghur Autonomous Region in China.

See also 
 List of Streptomyces species

References

Further reading

External links
Type strain of Streptomyces beijiangensis at BacDive -  the Bacterial Diversity Metadatabase

beijiangensis
Bacteria described in 2002